Bezerra de Menezes: O Diário de um Espírito (lit: Bezerra de Menezes: The Diary of a Spirit) is a 2008 biography drama film directed by Glauber Filho and Joe Pimentel about the Brazilian medium Bezerra de Menezes. It was shot in Fortaleza, Guaramiranga, Maranguape, and Jaguaruana, all cities in Ceará, as well as in Recife and Rio de Janeiro.

Plot
The 18-year-old Bezerra de Menezes (Magno Carvalho) begins his studies of medicine in Rio de Janeiro, then capital of Brazil. Abolitionist, Bezerra entered politics and was several times elected alderman and congressman. However it was his work with the most humble people that brought him fame, becoming known as the doctor of the poor.

Cast

 Carlos Vereza as Bezerra de Menezes
 Magno Carvalho as Bezerra de Menezes (young)
 Lucas Ribeiro as Bezerra de Menezes (child)
 Cláudio Raposo as Antônio Adolfo Bezerra de Menezes
 Juliana Carvalho as Dona Fabiana
 Mirelle Freitas as Maria Cândida
 Alexandra Marinho as Cândida Augusta
 Ana Rosa as Bezerra de Menezes' sister
 Everaldo Pontes as Soares
 Larissa Vereza as Sister-in-law of Bezerra de Menezes
 Lúcio Mauro as Leader of the spiritist Center
 Pedro Domingues as Mr Materialistic
 B. de Paiva as Dr. Leopoldino
 Taís Dahas as Hermínia

References

External links
 

Brazilian biographical drama films
2008 biographical drama films
2008 films
Films set in the 19th century
Films about Spiritism
Films shot in Fortaleza
Films shot in Recife
Films shot in Rio de Janeiro (city)
2008 drama films
2000s Portuguese-language films